The 1992 United States presidential election in New Hampshire took place on November 3, 1992, as part of the 1992 United States presidential election. Voters chose four representatives, or electors to the Electoral College, who voted for president and vice president.

New Hampshire was won by Governor Bill Clinton (D-Arkansas) with 38.91% of the popular vote over incumbent President George H. W. Bush (R-Texas) with 37.69%. Businessman Ross Perot (I-Texas) finished in third, with 22.59% of the popular vote. Clinton ultimately won the national vote, defeating incumbent President Bush. This was the best result the New England-born Bush would record in that region for the 1992 election.

Clinton's win marked the beginning of a dramatic shift in New Hampshire politics toward the Democratic Party. The state had been regarded as a Republican bastion, having previously voted Republican in every presidential election since 1944 except for Lyndon B. Johnson's 1964 landslide. In 1988 Bush carried the state by over 26 points, making it his second-best state in that election. Nevertheless, like the rest of New England, New Hampshire began trending hard toward the Democratic Party in the 1990s, and starting in 1992 the state has voted Democratic in every presidential election except 2000 when Bush's son eked out a narrow plurality over Clinton's vice president, Al Gore. This is the most recent election in which Hillsborough County backed the candidate who lost the presidency nationwide.

Primaries

Democratic primary

The 1992 New Hampshire Democratic primary was won by Paul Tsongas, but is known for the insurgent campaign of Bill Clinton, who managed a surprising second-place finish. It was held February 18, 1992.

The Iowa caucus, the first contest of the 1992 Democratic primaries, was not contested.  Due to the presence of Iowa Senator Tom Harkin in the race, the other candidates did not campaign in Iowa, instead conceding the contest to Harkin, and making the New Hampshire primary even more important.

On January 19, The Boston Globe published a poll showing Clinton ahead of the field with 29%, Paul Tsongas with 17%, and Bob Kerrey 16%.  Following this poll, reports of an extramarital affair between Clinton and Gennifer Flowers surfaced. As Clinton fell far behind former Massachusetts Senator Paul Tsongas in the New Hampshire polls, Clinton and his wife Hillary went on 60 Minutes following the Super Bowl to deny the charges. The Clinton campaign also weathered attacks concerning alleged draft dodging during the Vietnam War and the case of Ricky Ray Rector.

Tsongas won the New Hampshire primary with Clinton finishing within single digits of Tsongas, despite trailing badly in the polls.  Since many expected Tsongas to win anyway, as New Hampshire borders his home state of Massachusetts, the media viewed the results as a victory for Clinton. On election night, Clinton labeled himself "The Comeback Kid" and left New Hampshire with an increase in momentum in the remaining primaries, which helped him win the nomination.  Clinton became the first president elected despite not winning the New Hampshire primary. Since then, every non-incumbent candidate who has gone on to win the presidency has lost the New Hampshire primary, except Donald Trump in 2016.

Results
Paul Tsongas: 55,666 (33.21%)
Bill Clinton: 41,542 (24.78%)
Bob Kerrey: 18,584 (11.09%)	
Tom Harkin: 17,063 (10.18%)
Jerry Brown: 13,660 (8.15%)
Mario Cuomo: 6,577 (3.92%)
Tom Laughlin: 3,251 (1.94%)
Ralph Nader: 3,054 (1.82%)
Charles Woods: 2,862 (1.71%)
George Herbert Walker Bush: 1,433 (0.86%)
Pat Buchanan: 1,248 (0.74%)
Lenora Fulani: 402 (0.24%)
Larry Agran: 331 (0.20%)
Patrick J. Mahoney, Jr.: 303 (0.18%)
Eugene McCarthy: 211 (0.13%)
John Donald Rigazio: 186 (0.11%)
Curly Thornton: 125 (0.08%)
Lyndon LaRouche: 115 (0.07%)
Douglas Wilder: 103 (0.06%)
Caroline Killeen: 94 (0.06%)
John Patrick Cahill: 83 (0.05%)
Paul C. Fisher: 82 (0.05%)
Andre Marrou: 67 (0.04%)
Frank Bona: 65 (0.04%)
Karl J. Hegger: 61 (0.04%)

Source: Our Campaigns

Results

Results by county

See also
 Presidency of Bill Clinton
 United States presidential elections in New Hampshire

References

New Hampshire
1992
United States President